Anne-Mari Hyryläinen née Koskinen (born 15 August 1978) is a Finnish long-distance runner and a mountaineer. She competed in the marathon at the 2015 World Championships, finishing in 29th in a time of 2:41:59.  She competed in the 2016 Summer Olympics in Rio de Janeiro, Brazil. She also competed in the marathon at the 2017 World Championships, finishing 25th. Her personal best time was set in Dubai in 2018, and is 2:28:53.

Hyryläinen has climbed three of the world's fourteen 8,000m peaks: Everest in 2010, Manaslu in 2011 and Lhotse in 2013. She is the second Finnish woman to climb Everest, reaching the summit on 23 May 2010, just six days after her compatriot Carina Räihä.

References

External links
 Anne-Mari Hyryläinen's story about finding her passion - Gulf News

1978 births
Living people
Finnish female marathon runners
Finnish female long-distance runners
World Athletics Championships athletes for Finland
Athletes (track and field) at the 2016 Summer Olympics
Olympic athletes of Finland
Finnish summiters of Mount Everest